Kurt Daniel Birkins (born August 11, 1980) is an American former Major League Baseball (MLB) player who pitched for the Baltimore Orioles (2006-2007) and Tampa Bay Rays (2008).

High school/college 
Birkins attended El Camino Real high school in Woodland Hills, California. He played baseball for the Conquistadors and helped them win back-to-back LA City Championships in 1997 and 1998. He was named MVP of the 1998 championship game after throwing a 10 inning complete game, striking out 12, and hitting the go ahead 2-run double.

Birkins pitched for the UCLA Bruins in 1999 and led the staff in ERA, but decided to step away after the season due to burn out. During his time away from school, he volunteered as an assistant coach for his alma mater. That June, Birkins was selected in the 33rd round (984th overall) by the Baltimore Orioles. El Camino Real's senior infielder Conor Jackson was drafted in the 31st round (936th overall) by the Cleveland Indians which meant a player and coach from the same high school were drafted on the same day.

In the fall of 2000, Birkins enrolled at Los Angeles Pierce College and was rated by Baseball America as the #1 Junior College draft prospect in the country. Birkins signed with the Baltimore Orioles prior to the 2001 draft as they held his rights from the previous year as a "draft-and-follow" prospect.

MLB career
Birkins made his Major League debut on May 4, 2006, against the Texas Rangers throwing 2.1 scoreless innings in relief. He struck out Mark Texiera to record his first Major League strikeout. He picked up his first Major League victory on May 28, 2006, against the Anaheim Angels. Birkins retired all four batters he faced including two strikeouts.

After the 2007 season, Birkins was claimed off waivers by the Tampa Bay Rays. He was a member of the 2008 Tampa Bay Rays which won the franchise's first American League pennant.

He signed a minor league contract with the Colorado Rockies in February 2009 and pitched for the AAA Colorado Springs SkySox in 2009 and 2010. After conclusion of the 2010 season, Birkins retired from professional baseball.

Personal 
After his baseball career, Birkins enrolled at the University of North Carolina at Greensboro and graduated summa cum laude. He currently works in the commercial real estate industry and resides in Winston-Salem, North Carolina with his wife Ashley and their two daughters.

References

External links

1980 births
Living people
Aberdeen IronBirds players
American expatriate baseball players in Canada
Baltimore Orioles players
Baseball players from California
Bluefield Orioles players
Bowie Baysox players
Colorado Springs Sky Sox players
Delmarva Shorebirds players
Durham Bulls players
Frederick Keys players
Gulf Coast Orioles players
LAPC Brahma Bulls baseball players
Major League Baseball pitchers
Norfolk Tides players
Ottawa Lynx players
Tampa Bay Rays players
Tulsa Drillers players